Mount Sheridan is a suburb of Cairns in the Cairns Region, Queensland, Australia.

Geography 
The Bruce Highway and the North Coast railway line immediately to its east form the eastern boundary of the suburb.

History 
Mount Sheridan is situated in the Yidinji traditional Aboriginal country.

The suburb takes its name from the mountain of the same name, which is not located within the suburb but to the west in Lamb Range.

Education 
There are no schools in Mount Sheridan. The nearest government primary schools are White Rock State School in neighbouring White Rock to the east, Bentley Park State School in neighbouring Bentley Park to the south, and Woree State School in neighbouring Woree to the north. The nearest government secondary schools are Bentley Park College in Bentley Park and Woree State High School in Woree.

Facilities 
Forest View Cemetery is at 65-77 Foster Road. Cairns Crematorium is adjacent at  79-85 Foster Road .

Amenities 
Shopping centres in the suburb include:
 Mount Sheridan Plaza, 106 Barnard Drive 
 Forest Gardens Shopping Village, 121-127 Benjamina Street
There are a number of parks in the area, including:

 Forest Gardens Boulevard
 Foxtail Street Park
 George Cannon Drive Park 
 Tom Murray Park

References 

Suburbs of Cairns